Casino Deluxe is a video game developed and published by Impressions for the Microsoft Windows.

Gameplay
Casino Deluxe includes a variety of casino games, such as slot machines, pai gow, Caribbean stud poker, video poker, craps, roulette, and blackjack.

Reception

Next Generation reviewed the PC version of the game, rating it three stars out of five, and stated that "if you're into these games, this is the best one around." It received a largely positive review from Computer Game Review.

Reviews
PC Gamer (Oct, 1995)
Génération 4 (Nov, 1995)
Joystick (French) (Nov, 1995)

References

1995 video games
Casino video games
Digital card games
Impressions Games games
Multiple-game video board games
Windows games
Windows-only games